Burekup is a small town located on the South Western Highway in the South West region of Western Australia.

The town is built on the Collie River and was originally a railway siding on the Pinjarra-Picton line that was established in 1910 and known at the time as Boorekup.
Following a request from the Shire of Dardanup, the town was gazetted in 1973.

"Burekup" is the Indigenous Australian name for a wildflower that grows in the area.

References 

South West (Western Australia)